Vojislav "Vojkan" Melić (Serbian Cyrillic: Војислав Војкан Мелић; 5 January 1940 – 7 April 2006) was a Yugoslavian footballer. He was one of the most versatile and skilled players that Yugoslavia had in 1960s. Vojislav spent part of his career in France and played in the FIFA World Cup 1962.

Biography
Melić played his first match for Red Star in August 1960. He played 312 games and scored 54 goals. With Red Star he won "double crown". National Championship and Cup in 1963/64.

Melić was a member of Yugoslav National team from and he scored 2 goals in 27 matches. He was a very versatile player who was able to play almost any filed position (from right and left defender/midfielder/winger to striker). He officially played 7 different positions for the national team. In his first game for the national team against Columbia in FIFA World Cup 1962. in Chile, he scored his first goal. Yugoslavia finished 4th in the World.

Melić also played in 3 games for Yugoslavian U21 team from 1959-1961.

Melić played for French Sochaux from 1967-1973 and Beziers from 1973-1977.

He continued his coaching career in Beziers, FK Mačva Šabac, FK Crvenka and youth selections of Red Star until his death.

Melić died on 7 April 2006 in Belgrade, Serbia.

References

External links
Profile on Serbian federation site

1940 births
2006 deaths
Yugoslav footballers
Serbian footballers
Yugoslavia international footballers
Association football midfielders
Yugoslav First League players
Ligue 1 players
FK Mačva Šabac players
Red Star Belgrade footballers
Red Star Belgrade non-playing staff
FC Sochaux-Montbéliard players
AS Béziers Hérault (football) players
1962 FIFA World Cup players
Yugoslav expatriate footballers
Serbian expatriate footballers
Expatriate footballers in France
Sportspeople from Šabac
AS Béziers Hérault (football) managers
Serbian football managers